Westgate Resorts is an American timeshare resort company founded by David A. Siegel in 1982.

The company first expanded from Central Florida to Miami and Daytona Beach. As of July 2021, Westgate Resorts has 29 locations across the United States.

History
Founded in 1982, Westgate Resorts operates as a subsidiary of Central Florida Investments, Inc. (CFI), which employs over 10,000 people and has evolved into the largest privately held corporation in the Central Florida area. Siegel opened CFI, a real estate development firm, with an office located in his family garage in 1970.

The Westgate family of resorts was born in 1982 with the opening of a 16-unit resort at Westgate Vacation Villas. Westgate Lakes Resort & Spa opened in 1996, followed by Westgate Towers in 1997; Westgate Town Center and Westgate Smoky Mountain Resort & Spa in 1999; Westgate Flamingo Bay in 2001; Westgate Blue Tree Resort, Westgate Park City Resort & Spa and Westgate River Ranch in 2002; and Westgate Palace and Westgate Historic Williamsburg in 2003.

Westgate Resorts now encompasses more than 13,500 villas at 28 full-service resorts. Siegel was recognized as a CEO of the Year honoree by the Orlando Business Journal in 2014.

In 2016 Westgate Smoky Mountain Resort suffered extensive damage from a fire, rebuilding is said to have begun quickly. In May 2018, musician Barry Manilow returned to Las Vegas as the exclusive headliner at the Westgate International Theater at Westgate Las Vegas Resort & Casino. In June 2018, Westgate acquired the former Hilton New York Grand Central, a 23-floor, 300-room, two-tower hotel located in the historic Tudor City neighborhood within Midtown Manhattan's East Side that has been rebranded Westgate New York City.

The Queen of Versailles
In 2012, filmmaker Lauren Greenfield released a documentary entitled The Queen of Versailles, based on a series of interviews with Siegel, his wife Jackie Siegel, and their attempt to build a 90,000 square foot mansion, Versailles house, modeled after the famous French original. In the film, David Siegel is shown struggling (and ultimately failing) to secure funding for Westgate's Las Vegas high-rise resort, the PH Towers Westgate. Siegel's son and senior Westgate executive, Richard, is quoted as saying that David Siegel's determination not to lose the PH Tower was a major source of the company's financial troubles in 2009-11. On November 22, 2011, a controlling interest in the property was sold to Resort Finance America LLC.

Lawsuits

Legal dispute with building contractor
Westgate Resorts was sued in a federal court in Las Vegas for failure to pay bills relating to the pH Towers and building work allegedly carried out to a poor standard.  On February 27, 2013, Clark County District Judge Elizabeth Gonzalez ordered Westgate Resorts to pay the plaintiff, Tutor-Saliba Corp., $9 million in unpaid bills, and awarded $2.6m to Westgate for various shoddy building works including a cracked concrete swimming pool.

Class action lawsuit
Westgate Resorts was sued by 300 former sales employees in 2010 for unpaid sales commissions.  They won the lawsuit and Westgate Resorts were ordered to pay $600,000.  Despite paying $50,000 initially, Westgate stopped payment and the matter went back to the courts for another three years.  The matter was finally settled under Judge Michael Baxley, and Westgate agreed to pay $500,000, $100,000 less than the original judgement required.

In January 2014, Westgate Resorts filed dozens of new lawsuits against many of its former employees who were involved with this class action lawsuit, claiming that it deserves to recover previously paid sales commissions. According to the Orlando Sentinel, many of those included in these new lawsuits feel that these new legal actions are "...retaliation for the award granted to the defendant in a class action lawsuit," and one of the lawyers representing the former Westgate employees is quoted as saying that the action is "unconscionable".

United States of America versus Westgate Resorts Ltd
On January 20, 2009, Westgate Resorts Ltd. was found guilty and had to settle with the US Government for its violations of the Telemarketing Sales Rule ("Rule"), 16 C.F.R. Part 310, including the National Do Not Call Registry provisions.  As part of its settlement with the US Government, it had to pay a $900,000 fine.

Sexual harassment lawsuit
In 2004, Central Florida Investments and David Siegel were sued by former Westgate employee Dawn Myers. In 2008, they were found liable for battery after a trial in the United States District Court for the Middle District of Florida. The jury awarded $5,378,863.14 but the judge reduced the award to $610,469.84: $103,622.09 in compensatory damages and $506,847.75 in punitive damages. This award arose from Myers's claim of battery under state law, but her claims of sexual harassment were found to be time-barred. In January 2010, The United States Court of Appeals for the Eleventh Circuit dismissed an appeal and cross-appeal, affirming the district court's verdict.

Lawsuit against the Sundance Institute and the filmmakers of The Queen of Versailles
On January 10, 2012, David Siegel and Westgate Resorts, Ltd filed a lawsuit in Florida against the Sundance Institute and the filmmakers of The Queen of Versailles, claiming that Sundance's published film description was defamatory. On January 23, 2013, the United States District Court Judge Conway of the Middle District of Florida, ordered a stay of the lawsuit pending arbitration. In her order, Judge Conway called the testimony previously offered by Mr. Siegel during court hearings, "inconsistent and incredible and thus lacking weight".

The matter was subsequently heard before an arbitrator for the Independent Film & Television Alliance (IFTA) in June 2013. On March 13, 2014, the arbitrator awarded in favor of the filmmakers, Lauren Greenfield and Frank Evers, including an order that David Siegel and Westgate Resort pay $750,000 to the filmmakers.

The arbitrator wrote in the award, "Having viewed the supposedly egregious portions of the Motion Picture numerous times, [the Arbitrator] simply does not find that any of the content of the Motion Picture was false." The arbitrator also wrote that Westgate had failed to show how it was damaged from the documentary. Finally, the arbitrator wrote that Westgate "did not remotely establish the type of malice required for a defamation claim on behalf of a public figure."

Political controversy
CEO David Siegel, a Republican, sent an email in the fall of 2012 to all of his employees suggesting that he might "reduce the size of this company" if Obama were to win the 2012 presidential election. The email was widely interpreted by the media as a threat to the employees about possible layoffs if Barack Obama were to be re-elected.

Siegel admitted in the documentary The Queen of Versailles as to possibly illegal activities in Florida during the 2000 United States elections, which he claims were singularly responsible for getting George W. Bush into the White House.

In an August 2012 interview with Bloomberg Businessweek, Siegel elaborated on his claims:

References

External links

Timeshare Division
Westgate Events
Westgate Owner Rewards

Real estate companies of the United States
Companies based in Orlando, Florida
Siegel family
Timeshare chains
Real estate companies established in 1982
Hospitality companies established in 1982
American companies established in 1982
1982 establishments in Florida
1982 establishments in the United States